The Swedish Open, also known as the Swedish Open Championships (SOC), is an annual table tennis tournament in Sweden, run by the International Table Tennis Federation (ITTF). It is currently part of the ITTF World Tour.

History

The tournament was first held in 1954, and has featured on the ITTF World Tour's schedule frequently since the tour's inception in 1996, including every year since 2011.

China's Fan Zhendong and Wang Liqin jointly hold the record for most men's singles tournament wins, with three. Agnes Simon holds the record for the most women's singles tournament wins, with four, representing the Netherlands for her first title and West Germany for the other three.

In August 2016, it was announced by the ITTF that Stockholm has been chosen as one of six cities to host a regular World Tour event in the revamped 2017 schedule. This is the equivalent of the Major Series status that the tournament currently holds, with "Platinum" events replacing the Super Series as the tour's top tier.

Champions

Individual Events

1954 - 1987

1989 - 2018

2019 - present

Team Events

See also
European Table Tennis Union

References

External links
International Table Tennis Federation
Swedish Table Tennis Association (in Swedish)
Swedish Open Championships

ITTF World Tour
Table tennis competitions
Table tennis competitions in Sweden
Annual sporting events in Sweden
Recurring sporting events established in 1954
Table tennis